Herman Taylor may refer to:
 Herman L. Taylor, Jr. (born 1966), American member of the Maryland House of Delegates
 Herman H. Taylor, Republican politician from Idaho